The 1964 United States presidential election in Iowa took place on November 3, 1964, as part of the 1964 United States presidential election. Iowa voters chose nine representatives, or electors, to the Electoral College, who voted for president and vice president.

Iowa was won by incumbent President Lyndon B. Johnson (D–Texas), with 61.88% of the popular vote, against Senator Barry Goldwater (R–Arizona), with 37.92% of the popular vote. , this is the last election in which Pottawattamie County, Plymouth County, Mahaska County, Mills County, Harrison County, Grundy County, Shelby County, Montgomery County, Fremont County, Ida County, and Osceola County voted for a Democratic presidential candidate. This is also the last time until 1988 that the state would vote for a Democratic presidential candidate.

As of 2020, this remains the strongest performance by a Democrat in Iowa.

Results

Results by county

See also
 United States presidential elections in Iowa

References

Iowa
1964
1964 Iowa elections